Lund is a village in Namsos municipality in Trøndelag county, Norway. Norwegian County Road 769 runs through the village. Lund Chapel is located in the village. The village is connected to the rest of Norway by road by two bridges over the Fjærangen fjord to the south: Hestøy Bridge and Smines Bridge, and it is connected to the neighboring Nærøysund municipality by a ferry to the north.

Prior to 2020, the village and surrounding area was part of the old Nærøy municipality.

References

Villages in Trøndelag
Namsos